Harvey Shapiro may refer to:

 Harvey Shapiro (musician) (1911–2007), American cellist
 Harvey Shapiro (poet) (1924–2013), American poet and editor of The New York Times
 Harvey Shapiro (baseball), American baseball coach